Woody Hartman is a retired American soccer goalkeeper and coach.  He played professionally in the American Soccer League, leading the league in saves in 1976, and the Major Indoor Soccer League.  He also coached at the collegiate and professional levels.

Hartman graduated from Frankford High School.  He attended Temple University, where he played on the men's soccer team from 1972 to 1974.  In 1976, Hartman turned professional with the New Jersey Americans of the American Soccer League.  He led the league in saves.  That fall, he began his coaching career as head coach of the Father Judge High School soccer team, a position he held until 1980.  In 2006, Father Judge High School inducted Hartman into its Hall of Honor.  He did not play professionally again until 1978 when he signed with the Philadelphia Fever of the Major Indoor Soccer League.  He spent three seasons with the Fever.  In 1984, Hartman became the assistant coach to Lew Meehl at Philadelphia Textile.  In 1993, both Meehl and Hartman moved to Drexel University.  On September 26, 1996, Hartman left Drexel to become the goalkeeper coach for the Philadelphia KiXX of the National Professional Soccer League.  In 1997, he returned to Drexel as an assistant to Meehl.

External links
 Career stats
 Drexel Dragons: Woody Hartman

References

Living people
1954 births
Soccer players from Philadelphia
American soccer players
American soccer coaches
American Soccer League (1933–1983) players
Major Indoor Soccer League (1978–1992) players
National Professional Soccer League (1984–2001) coaches
New Jersey Americans (ASL) players
Philadelphia Fever (MISL) players
Temple Owls men's soccer players
Association football goalkeepers